This article lists the results for the Japan national football team between 1917 and 1939.

1917

1921

1923

1925

1927

1930

1934

1936

1939 
Because the opponents were considered to be puppet states and not internationally recognized, the matches  were not recorded by FIFA.

References

External links
Japan Football Association

Japan national football team results
1910s in Japanese sport
1920s in Japanese sport
1930s in Japanese sport